Shch-214 was a  of the Soviet Navy. Her keel was laid down by 61 Kommunara in Nikolajev on 13 July 1935. She was launched on 23 April 1937 and commissioned on 4 March 1939 in the Black Sea Fleet. The submarine was under the command of Captain Vlasov Vladimir Yakovlevich until the loss of the vessel.

Service history 
Shch-214 served in the southern Black Sea, with some success, often striking against neutral Turkish schooners.

On 22 January 1942, she was damaged in a storm at Tuapse when she was crushed against the quayside by the destroyer . Repairs took fifteen days to complete.

Loss 
After her patrols in the southern Black Sea, the submarine was employed as a transport unit to support the Soviet forces in the Siege of Sevastopol. During one of these missions, Shch-214 was torpedoed while on the surface by the Italian motor torpedo boat MAS-571 on 19 June 1942. Two of her crew were taken as prisoners of war and one later escaped.

References 

1937 ships
Shchuka-class submarines
Ships built in the Soviet Union
World War II submarines of the Soviet Union
Maritime incidents in January 1942
Maritime incidents in June 1942
World War II shipwrecks in the Black Sea
Submarines sunk by Italian warships